Cefoperazone/sulbactam is a combination drug used as an antibiotic.  It is effective for the treatment of urinary tract infections.  It contains cefoperazone, a β-lactam antibiotic, and sulbactam, a β-lactamase inhibitor, which helps prevent bacteria from breaking down cefoperazone.

References 

Combination drugs
Antibiotics